Gilətağ or Gilətagh or Gilətag may refer to:
Gilətağ, Azerbaijan
Dərə Gilətağ, Azerbaijan
Böyük Gilətağ, Azerbaijan